Rip It Up may  refer to:

Music

Albums
 Rip It Up (Dead or Alive album), 1987
 Rip It Up (Little Richard album), 1973
 Rip It Up (Orange Juice album), 1982
 Rip It Up (Thunder album), 2017

Songs
 "Rip it Up" (James Reyne song), 1987
 "Rip It Up" (Little Richard song), 1956, also recorded by Bill Haley & His Comets
 "Rip It Up" (Jet song), 2006
 "Rip It Up" (Razorlight song), 2003
 "Rip It Up" (Orange Juice song), 1983
 "Rip It Up", a 1981 song by Adolescents from the eponymous album
 "Rip It Up", a 2000 song by 28 Days from the album Upstyledown

Magazines
 Rip It Up (magazine), a New Zealand-based music magazine
 Rip It Up (Adelaide), a weekly Adelaide street press magazine

See also
 Rip It Up and Start Again, a 2005 book on post-punk music by Simon Reynolds
 Rip It
 Rip (disambiguation)